Nicholas Polanco (born August 18, 1980) is an American former lacrosse player. He is regarded as one of the best defensemen in MLL (and professional lacrosse in general) history. He attended Oceanside High School.

Professional career
Polanco was drafted by the Bridgeport Barrage in the 1st round (4th overall) of the 2002 Major League Lacrosse Collegiate Draft.  In 2004, he was awarded the Major League Lacrosse Defensive Player of the Year Award and led the Barrage to winning the Steinfeld Cup.

In 2005, Polanco was traded to the Long Island Lizards where he was again given the Major League Lacrosse Defensive Player of the Year Award and was selected for his second consecutive All-Star game.

Polanco played just one season in the National Lacrosse League with the New York Saints in 2003.

His brother, Armando, played for the Philadelphia Barrage.

On May 17, 2012, Polanco was traded to the Chesapeake Bayhawks.

Collegiate career
Polanco transferred to Hofstra University, for his final two years of eligibility, after playing two seasons at Nassau Community College.  While at Nassau, Polanco lead his team to win the National Junior College Athletic Association championships in 1999 and 2000.  He was named National Junior College Athletic Association Player of the Year.

Following his transfer, Polanco earned All-America honors each of his two years at Hofstra, and as a senior he was named Colonial Athletic Association Player and Defensive Player of the Year.

Honors and awards
• Member of 2006 U.S. Men's National Team 
• Named alternate to the 2002 U.S. Men's National Team 
• Colonial Athletic Association Player of the Year (2002)
• 1st Team All-American (2002) & Honorable Mention All-American (2001)
• National Junior College Athletic Association Player of the Year (1999, 2000 at Nassau C.C.)  Richard D'Agostino is the former doctor for the Long Island Lizards.

Statistics

MLL

NLL

College

External links
 Nicky Polanco Team USA Player Bio
 Nicky Polanco Long Island Lizards Player Bio
 Nicky Polanco professional lacrosse stats via statscrew.com

1980 births
Living people
American lacrosse players
Hofstra Pride men's lacrosse players
Major League Lacrosse major award winners
Major League Lacrosse players
Nassau Community College alumni